Lagoa do Tocantins is a municipality in the state of Tocantins in the Northern region of Brazil.

The municipality is in the microregion of Jalapão.

See also
List of municipalities in Tocantins

References

Municipalities in Tocantins